The 1899 Ole Miss Rebels football team represented the University of Mississippi during the 1899 Southern Intercollegiate Athletic Association football season. Led by W. H. Lyon in his first and only season as head coach, Ole Miss compiled an overall record of 3–4. The season closed with a defeat of Tulane.

Schedule

References

Ole Miss
Ole Miss Rebels football seasons
Ole Miss Rebels football